Tenos was a town in ancient Thessaly, noted in ancient Greek folklore for a supposedly remarkable venomous snake and its equally remarkable demise. It is unlocated.

References

Populated places in ancient Thessaly
Former populated places in Greece
Lost ancient cities and towns